In Romania's 2004 general election, held on 28 November, no party won an outright majority. The Social Democratic Party (PSD) won the largest number of seats but was in opposition because the Justice and Truth Alliance (DA), the Democratic Alliance of Hungarians in Romania (UDMR/RMDSZ), the Romanian Humanist Party (PUR; which later became the Conservative Party), and the National Minorities formed a governing coalition. The Conservative Party (PC) withdrew in December 2006, meaning that the government lost the majority. In April 2007, the liberal Prime Minister, Călin Popescu-Tăriceanu, dismissed the Democratic Party (PD) ministers from the government and formed a minority government with the Democratic Alliance of Hungarians in Romania (UDMR/RMDSZ), thereby marking the end of the Justice and Truth Alliance (DA).

Senate 
The President of the Senate for this legislature was Nicolae Văcăroiu, who was elected on 20 December 2004. Following his ad interim presidency of Romania, he delegated his attributions to the vicepresident . After Văcăroiu was sworn in as president of the Court of Accounts, Ilie Sârbu was elected as the new President of the Senate.

The table below gives the state of play before the 2008 election; parties in bold were part of the governing coalition at the end of this legislature.

Chamber of Deputies 

During the 2004–2008 legislature, the president of the Chamber of Deputies was Bogdan Olteanu from the National Liberal Party (PNL), who was elected on 20 March 2006, after the Chamber's former president, Adrian Năstase, was forced by his own party (the Social Democratic Party, PSD) to step down amidst corruption allegations.

After the 2004 elections, several deputies from the  switched to other parties (including the governing Justice and Truth Alliance, DA) or became independents, with the total number of  seats being reduced from 113 to 105. The number of Justice and Truth Alliance (DA) deputies also increased from 112 to 118, making it the largest formation in parliament as of October 2006. Since April 2007 the Justice and Truth Alliance (DA) has split leaving the two former members with 51 respectively 50 members. Deputies elected to the European Parliament in the 2007 election resigned, thus reducing the number of deputies to 314 as of 4 December 2007.

A new election was held in 2008. The table below gives the state of play before the 2008 election; parties in bold were part of the governing coalition at the end of this legislature. That coalition was tacitly supported by the PSD.

See also 
 Parliament of Romania

References 

Legislatures of the Romanian Parliament
2004 in Romania
2005 in Romania
2006 in Romania
2007 in Romania
2008 in Romania